Bimal Chandra College of Law is a college of legal education in Kandi, Murshidabad,  West Bengal. It was established in the year 2002. The college is affiliated to University of Kalyani and also approved by the Bar Council of India (BCI), New Delhi.

Courses 
The college offers a five-years integrated B.A. LL.B. (Hons.) course.

See also

References

External links 
 
University of Kalyani
University Grants Commission
National Assessment and Accreditation Council

Law schools in West Bengal
Universities and colleges in Murshidabad district
Colleges affiliated to University of Kalyani
Educational institutions established in 2002
2002 establishments in West Bengal